Edmund Franciszek Twórz (12 February 1914 – 29 September 1987) was a Polish footballer (defender) who was in the Polish squad called up for the 1938 FIFA World Cup, but was left in Poland prior to the beginning of the tournament, as only 15 players went to Strasbourg. During that time he played for Warta Poznań. He was capped six times for Poland:

 1937 :
- Bulgaria  3:3  Poland

- Poland  2:1    Latvia
 1938
- Latvia  2:1   Poland

 1939
- France  4:0   Poland

- Poland  3:3   Belgium

- Poland  1:1   Switzerland

References and sources 
 Andrzej Gowarzewski : "Fuji Football Encyclopedia : History of the Polish National Team(1) White and Red" ; GiA Katowice 1991

Polish footballers
Warta Poznań players
1938 FIFA World Cup players
1914 births
1987 deaths
Poland international footballers
Association football defenders
People from Śmigiel
Sportspeople from Greater Poland Voivodeship